Pamela Fitzgerald may refer to:

 Pamela FitzGerald, Lady Edward FitzGerald (–1831)
 Pamela Fitzgerald (camogie) (born 1984), Irish camogie player